Dark Side of the Spoon is the seventh studio album by American industrial metal band Ministry, released on June 8, 1999 by Warner Bros. Records. "Bad Blood" was nominated for a Grammy Award for Best Metal Performance in 2000.

Background
Dark Side of the Spoon features less aggressive songs than Ministry's previous albums, and frontman Al Jourgensen had intended it to be the case. He wanted to branch out from the "drug-infused" records of The Mind Is a Terrible Thing to Taste and Psalm 69 to more "unfamiliar territory".

In his autobiography, Jourgensen confirmed that the title has two meanings: one of which is a play on words referencing Pink Floyd's The Dark Side of the Moon and the other is the blackened (or dark side) of a spoon heated to dissolve heroin, as several members of the band suffered from long-term addiction to said substance at the time.

The saxophone part of the song "10/10" is taken from the last 22 seconds of "Group Dancers" on the Charles Mingus album The Black Saint and the Sinner Lady. "Whip and Chain" and "Bad Blood" feature vocals from Ty Coon, Al Jourgensen's girlfriend at the time.

In 2021, Jourgensen listed "Nursing Home" and "Supermanic Soul" in his top ten favorite Ministry songs.

Packaging controversy
The album's cover, which features a nude, obese woman sitting in front of a black board with "I will be god" written repeatedly on it; gained controversy and resulted in the album being pulled from Kmart. Jourgensen originally had the idea of having a child drawing on the blackboard but Barker suggested to have a fat woman instead to evoke the image of 'fattened Americans doing what they're told.'

Reception

AllMusic critic Steve Huey wrote: "While it is a better record than Filth Pig, that's largely because of a few strong moments propping up a number of surprisingly bland attempts at aggression." Huey further stated that the record "can't be considered the successful expansion of their sound that would bode well for the future." Elisabeth Vincentelli of Entertainment Weekly thought that "time may have finally caught up with these thrash-industrial veterans", remarking that the record "doesn't get that fast or heavy again"  after the first track, "Supermanic Soul". Describing the record as "a contrary beast", NME wrote that the record "amounts to an uneven, frequently unfunny knot of confusion" and further stated: "It's as though Jourgensen's swapped his black humour for a black dog that won't stop howling, however much he beats it."

Reviewing for Rolling Stone, Neva Chonin thought that the record "sinks into the same complacent rut" as Filth Pig, further explaining: "From the stentorian rhythms and predictably ghoulish vocal samples to the bellowed doomsday incantations and chugging wall of guitars, everything here feels like a reflex." Spin critic Mark Lepage wrote that Dark Side of the Spoon does not achieve the standards that the band set on Psalm 69, "not delivering enough of the medicine."

Track listing

Hidden tracks
After the end of track 9, tracks of silence begin. There are 58 silent tracks on the album, totaling 10:26

Tracks 15–67 are all approximately four seconds in length.

"Everybody" is track 68 (track 69 on the Japanese edition). Houses of the Molé, another Ministry album, features a hidden track called "Walrus" which is also track 69. According to BMI, track 68 is called "Summertime". AllMusic and the official website of the band refer to this track as "Everybody". ITunes lists this track as "Dialogue".

Personnel

Ministry
Al Jourgensen – vocals, slide guitar, electronics, banjo (6),  saxophone, production
Paul Barker – bass, electronics, vocals (8), production
Rey Washam – drums, electronics
Louis Svitek – guitar, electronics

Additional personnel
Ty Coon – vocals (2, 3, 68)
Yvonne Gage – vocals (4)
Zlatko Hukic – guitar, electronics
Jason Bacher – engineering
Jeff Dehaven – engineering
Bryan Kenny – engineering
Esther Nevarez – engineering
Brad Kopplin – engineering
Tom Baker – mastering
Paul Elledge – art direction, photography

Charts

References

1999 albums
Ministry (band) albums
Warner Records albums
Albums produced by Al Jourgensen
Obscenity controversies in music